The Newfoundland and Labrador Book Awards were established in 1997 by the Writer's Alliance of Newfoundland and Labrador (WANL), Canada. The awards are administered in partnership with the Literary Arts Foundation of Newfoundland and Labrador. The categories for the awards alternate on a bi-yearly basis, with fiction and children's/young adult literature being featured one year, and poetry and non-fiction being featured the next.  The winner of each category receives a $1,500 prize. Two runners-up in each category are also selected and receive a $500 prize.

Guidelines 
The awards are open to residents of the province of Newfoundland and Labrador. For the administration of these awards, WANL defines residents as individuals who meet one of two conditions. The first condition is that they have lived in the province for 12 months immediately prior to the release of publication of their written piece. The second is that they have lived in the province for at least 36 out of the previous 60 months, with no requirement for those months to be consecutive. An award can also be won posthumously if one of the residency conditions were met. To be eligible, a book must be in English and authored by a single individual. Translated books, as well as those that are self-published, are eligible.

Winners

References 

Canadian literary awards
Newfoundland and Labrador awards